The Leader Bank Pavilion is an outdoor amphitheater located in Boston, Massachusetts, used for concerts. It seats 5,000. Its season runs from May until October. The venue originally opened in August 1994 near Fan Pier. Due to land rights, it closed at the end of its season in 1998 and the tensile structure was relocated to its current location in South Boston, where it reopened in July 1999.

Name rights
 Harbor Lights Pavilion was the original name. Originally located at the site of the current US District Courthouse at Fan Pier, it was moved a few hundred yards down the street when the courthouse was built.
 Bank of Boston Pavilion.
 BankBoston Pavilion. When Bank of Boston and Baybank merged in 1996 to form BankBoston, the pavilion likewise changed its name to the BankBoston Pavilion.
 FleetBoston Pavilion. In 1999, Live Nation purchased the venue and sold the naming rights to FleetBoston Financial, renaming it FleetBoston Pavilion.
 Bank of America Pavilion. In 2004 FleetBoston merged with Bank of America and the pavilion was then renamed to Bank of America Pavilion.
 Blue Hills Bank Pavilion. Beginning January 1, 2014, Blue Hills Bank won the naming rights for the venue for a period of just under 10 years.
Rockland Trust Bank Pavilion. Beginning February 4, 2019, following Rockland Trust Bank's acquisition of Blue Hills Bank.
Leader Bank Pavilion. Beginning April 5, 2021, Leader Bank won the naming rights for the venue.

Noted performers

311
Al Jarreau
The All American Rejects
All Time Low
The Allman Brothers Band
Amy Grant
The Arcade Fire
Barenaked Ladies - 2010, 2012, 2013, 2015, 2016, 2018, 2022, 2023
B.B. King
Beck
Björk
Big Time Rush
Billie Eilish
Black Rebel Motorcycle Club -(B.R.M.C.) - 2022
Blondie
Britney Spears
Chicago
Chris Cornell
Coldplay
Counting Crows
The Cult - 2022
Culture Club
Cypress Hill
Dan Fogelberg
Dashboard Confessional
David Byrne
Demi Lovato 
Diana Ross
Don Henley
Donna Summer
Dream Theater
Elvis Costello and The Attractions
Extreme
Faith No More
Father John Misty
Fifth Harmony
Florence and the Machine
Frank Sinatra
Gipsy Kings
Gorillaz
Guster
Imagine Dragons 
James Brown
Joan Jett and the Blackhearts
John Denver
Josh Groban
J Geils Band
King Crimson
Keane
Lauryn Hill
Liam Gallagher
Liza Minnelli
Luther Vandross
Marina Diamandis
Mastodon
Megadeth
Meghan Trainor - 2015, 2016
Modest Mouse
Muse 
Nas
Natalie Cole
Night Ranger
Nina Simone
No Doubt
Norah Jones
Peter Frampton
Phoebe Bridgers
Poison
Primus
Radiohead
Richard Ashcroft
Rob Thomas (musician) (2016) - Rob Is Also The Lead Vocalist/Songwriter WithMatchbox Twenty
Roberta Flack
Roxy Music
Ryan Adams
Sammy Hagar and the Circle
Spoon
Steely Dan
Steve Miller Band
Stevie Wonder
Styx
The Strokes
Sublime with Rome
Tori Amos
Twenty One Pilots
Van Morrison
Ween
"Weird Al" Yankovic (Strings Attached Tour)

Recordings
On September 7, 1997, Widespread Panic recorded a version of their song "Pickin' Up the Pieces" with special guest Branford Marsalis for the live album Light Fuse, Get Away.

On August 21, 2007, progressive metal band Dream Theater recorded three songs for their live album and DVD Chaos in Motion 2007–2008.

See also
List of contemporary amphitheatres

References

External links

Music venues completed in 1994
Amphitheaters in the United States
Music venues in Boston
1994 establishments in Massachusetts